Gaula or Gowla (pronounced gauḷa) is a rāgam in Carnatic music (musical scale of South Indian classical music). It is a janya rāgam (derived scale) from the 15th melakarta scale Mayamalavagowla. It is a janya scale, as it does not have all the seven swaras (musical notes) in the ascending and descending scale.

Gaula is an ancient rāgam mentioned in Sangita Ratnakara, Sangita Makarandha and Sangita samayasara. It is an auspicious rāgam, which is mostly sung in the early part of the concert. It is a popular rāgam and also a ghana rāgam.

Structure and Lakshana 
Gaula is an asymmetric rāgam that does not contain dhaivatam in the scale and does not contain gandharam in the ascending scale. It is an audava-vakra-shadava rāgam (or owdava, meaning pentatonic ascending scale). Vakra-shadava means that the descending scale has 6 notes with inclusion of zig-zag movements (vakra). Its ārohaṇa-avarohaṇa structure (ascending and descending scale) is as follows:

ārohaṇa : 
avarohaṇa : 

The notes used in this scale are shadjam, ekasruti rishabham (also known as Gaula rishabham), shuddha madhyamam, panchamam and kakali nishadham in ascending scale, with antara gandharam included in descending scale. For the details of the notations and terms, see swaras in Carnatic music.

Popular compositions
There are many compositions set to Gaula rāgam. Here are some popular kritis composed in this rāgam.

The second Pancharatna Kriti, Duduku gala, composed by Tyagaraja, the second of the 5 gems
Sri Mahaganapatir avatumam and Tyagaraja palayasumam by Muthuswami Dikshitar
Kaama Janaka by Maharaja Swathi Thirunal
Pranamamyaham by Mysore Vasudevachar

Film Songs

Language:Tamil

Notes

References

Janya ragas